Red Deer/South 40 Airstrip  was an airport  west of Red Deer, Alberta, Canada.

References

Defunct airports in Alberta
Red Deer County